Pirthi Singh Numberdar is an Indian politician. He was elected to the Haryana Legislative Assembly from Narwana, Haryana in the 2009 and 2014 as a member of the Indian National Lok Dal.

He was one of the four MLA who joined the Dushyant Chautala's Jannayak Janta Party after a split in Indian National Lok Dal.

References 

Living people
Members of the Haryana Legislative Assembly
Indian National Lok Dal politicians
Jannayak Janta Party politicians
People from Jind district
Year of birth missing (living people)